The 2015–16 season was the Persepolis's 15th season in the Pro League, and their 33rd consecutive season in the top division of Iranian Football. They were also competing in the Hazfi Cup.  Persepolis is captained by Alireza Noormohammadi.

The season was affected by the death of captain Hadi Norouzi, aged 30, on 1 October from heart failure, being given the armband only at the start of the season. The news came as a big shock to Persepolis and Iranian football. A memorial was held at Azadi Stadium on 2 October which was attended by 20,000 mourners. His body was kept at the stadium for one day and then was transferred to Babol. His funeral was held on the following day and he was buried at his hometown, Kapur Chal village at Babol.

Key events

 In the morning of 1 October 2015, Persepolis team manager Mahmoud Khordbin announced that the club captain Hadi Norouzi died in his sleep from a heart attack due to hypertrophic cardiomyopathy. Resuscitation attempts on the way to the hospital failed.

Squad

First team squad

Apps and goals updated as of 31 December 2015 
For more on the reserve and academy squads, see Persepolis Novin, Persepolis Academy, Persepolis Shomal & Persepolis Qaem Shahr.
Source: fc-perspolis.com, FFIRI.IR

Iran Pro League squad
Updated 29 July 2015.

 U21 = Under 21 Player
 U23 = Under 23 Player

Out on loan

For recent transfers, see List of Iranian football transfers summer 2015.
For more on the reserve and academy squads, see Persepolis Novin, Persepolis Academy, Persepolis Shomal & Persepolis Qaem Shahr.

New Contracts

Transfers

In

Out

Technical staff

|}

Competitions

Overview

Persian Gulf Pro League

Standings

Results summary

Results by round

Matches

Hazfi Cup

Friendly Matches

Pre-season

During season

Statistics

Appearances and goals

Disciplinary record

Bookings & sendings-off

Suspensions

Injuries during the season 
Players in bold are still out from their injuries.

Notes
DM Substituted during match.
R Player released by The club during his injury time.

Captaincy

Overall statistics

Club

Kit 

|
|
|

Sponsorship 

Main sponsor: Hamrah-e Avval
Official sponsor: Kosar Credit Cooperative
Official shirt manufacturer:Uhlsport

Official water: Damavand Mineral Water Co.

See also
 2015–16 Iran Pro League
 2015–16 Hazfi Cup

References

External links
Iran Premier League Statistics
Persian League
Persepolis News

Persepolis F.C. seasons
Persepolis